Rent regulation in New York is a means of limiting the amount of rent charged on dwellings. Rent control and rent stabilization are two programs used in parts of New York state (and other jurisdictions). In addition to controlling rent, the system also prescribes rights and obligations for tenants and landlords.

Each city in the state chooses whether to participate. As of 2007, 51 municipalities participated in the program, including Albany, Buffalo and New York City, where over one million apartments are regulated. Other rent-controlled municipalities include Nassau, Westchester, Rensselaer, Schenectady and Erie counties.

In New York City, rent stabilization applies to all apartments except for certain classes of housing accommodations for so long as they uphold the status that gives them the exemption.

As of 2022, there are over 40,000 vacant rent regulated units in New York City.

Rent control

Qualification 
To qualify for rent control, a tenant must have been continuously living in an apartment since July 1, 1971, or be a qualifying family member who succeeded to such tenancy. When vacant, a rent-controlled unit becomes "rent stabilized", except in buildings with fewer than six units, where it is usually decontrolled. In units within single and two-family homes, the tenant must have resided in the unit continuously since March 31, 1952, to qualify for rent control. Once the unit becomes vacant, it is decontrolled. Rent control does not generally apply to units built after 1947.

Terms
Rent control limits the price a landlord can charge a tenant for rent and also regulates the services the landlord must provide. Failure to provide these may allow the tenant to receive a lower rent. Outside of New York City, the state government determines the maximum rents and rate increases, and owners may periodically apply for increases.

In New York City, rent control is based on the Maximum Base Rent system. A maximum allowable rent is established for each unit. Every two years, the landlord may increase the rent up to 7.5% (as of 2012) until the Maximum Base Rent is reached. However, the tenant may challenge these increases on grounds that the building has violations or that the higher amount exceeds that needed to cover expenses. Maximum Base Rent (MBR) is calculated to ensure the rent from rent control units covers the cost of building maintenance and improvements. The formula reflects real estate taxes, water and sewer charges, operating and maintenance expenses, return on capital and vacancy and collection loss allowance. The MBR is updated every two years to reflect changes in these expenses. Owners must apply for the Maximum Base Rent system for the tenants.

Rent stabilization
Rent stabilization is applicable to New York City, Nassau, Rockland and Westchester Counties. It generally applies to buildings of six or more units built before 1974 that are not subject to rent control. Owners of more recent buildings can agree to rent stabilization in exchange for tax benefits. Regulation and policies vary by municipality. Buildings such as housing owned by non-profit corporations are not included in the program. Upon leaving programs such as the Mitchell-Lama Housing Program or Section 8, housing may enter rent stabilization if built before 1974. Apartments that are converted into co-ops and condos and vacated after July 7, 1993 may not be subject to rent stabilization. For rents to be placed under regulation, the municipality must declare a housing emergency and the rental vacancy rate must be less than 5% for all or any class or classes of rental housing accommodations, as demonstrated by a housing vacancy survey.

Qualification
New York City rent stabilization qualifications changed over the years, purportedly to curb perceived abuses that allowed the wealthy to enjoy  protection that was ostensibly intended for the working class. The apartment must be the tenant's primary residence to qualify for stabilization. Vacancy Decontrol and High-Income Deregulation were enacted in 1997 and abolished in 2019. Renovations are no longer a path to deregulation, nor is any level of rent increase, as there is no high-rent threshold. Apartments that were legally deregulated prior to 2019 remain market rate.

Tenants who live in buildings built between February 1, 1947, and January 1, 1974, or who move into a pre-1947 building or into certain post-1974 buildings that received tax breaks (such as the 80-20 housing program) qualify for rent stabilization if the other above terms are met. As part of city managed programs, some buildings become temporarily rent stabilized in return for a temporary reduction in real estate taxes when those buildings have been converted to residential use from commercial or industrial. Two of those programs, J-51 for renovating buildings and 421-a for new construction, grant temporary rent stabilization to tenants of apartments in those buildings, thus overriding other qualifications.

Terms
Rent stabilization sets maximum rates for annual rent increases and, as with rent control, entitles tenants to receive required services from their landlords along with lease renewals. The rent guidelines board meets every year to determine how much the landlord can charge. Violations may cause a tenant's rent to be lowered. There are multiple ways a building owner can free their property from rent regulation: two popular methods are to claim substantial rehabilitation or the need for demolition.

History
In 1920, New York adopted Emergency Rent Laws, which effectively charged the courts of New York State with their administration. When challenged by tenants, rent increases were reviewed by a standard of "reasonableness." The definition of reasonableness was subject to judicial interpretation. Certain apartments were decontrolled beginning in 1926, and the Rent Laws of 1920 expired completely in June 1929, although limited protections against evictions considered unjust were continued.

Federal regulation (1943–1950)
In 1942, President Franklin D. Roosevelt signed the Emergency Price Control Act into law. The goal of the act was to prevent inflation in the booming, fully employed wartime economy by setting price controls nationwide. In November 1943, the Office of Price Administration froze New York rents at their March 1, 1943, levels. When the Emergency Price Control Act expired in 1947, Congress passed the Federal Housing and Rent Act of 1947, which exempted construction after February 1, 1947, from rent controls, but continued that regulation for properties already completed by that date. New York's current rent control program began in 1943. It is the longest-running in the United States.

State regulation (1950–1962)
The state of New York took over when federal regulation ended in 1950. Under the first permanent state laws in 1951, New York took a similar regulatory approach to the federal government. At the time there were about 2,500,000 rental units statewide, 85% of them in New York City. The initial laws covered all rental units, and regulated all relationships between owners and tenants concerning rents, services, and evictions.

Into the 1950s, a severe housing shortage prompted the first deregulation of rental units. In New York City, apartments in single and two-family homes became deregulated after April 1, 1953. Cities and towns outside New York City were given permission to deregulate when ready. The most expensive luxury apartments in New York City began to be deregulated starting in 1958. By 1961, only New York City and 18 of New York's 57 other counties had rent regulation.

Mixed regulation (1962–1984)
New York City and the state government began dual administration of rent regulation in 1962, and 75,000 expensive apartments were gradually deregulated by 1968. In 1969, construction and vacancy rates slumped, causing non-regulated rents to rise nationally. This rapid increase in rents caused New York to pass the Rent Stabilization Law of 1969, which introduced rent stabilization to units built after the 1947 cutoff for buildings to be eligible for rent control, covering approximately 325,000 units in New York City.

The Local Law 30 of 1970 introduced a new method of rent control price calculation, based on the Maximum Base Rate, which adapted to the changing costs faced by landlords, allowing them to pass those costs on to renters. A 1971 law took away New York City's ability to regulate rents and gave the power to the state government, in Albany.

State regulation (1984–present)
The passage of the Rent Regulation Reform Act of 1997 restricted rent stabilization to apartments where the legal, or stabilized, rent was under $2,000 per month. The decontrol rent was set at $2,000. The decontrol income was $175,000.

In June 2011, the New York State Legislature in Albany enacted the Rent Act of 2011. It did the following:

Limited vacancy increases to once a year
Reduced the permanent rent increase in buildings of 35 units or more for individual apartment improvements to 1/60th instead of 1/40th of the cost
Increased the minimum rent for deregulation of an apartment to $2,500
Increased the household income to $200,000 for deregulating an occupied apartment with a rent of at least $2,500
In June 2015, the New York State Legislature in Albany enacted the Rent Act of 2015.  Rent laws were extended four more years through 2019.

 Increased the minimum rent for high-rent or high-income deregulation of an apartment to $2,700, which will be adjusted each year by the one-year increase allowed by the Rent Guidelines Board.  The minimum rent for deregulation now is achieved following the prior lease and not as a result of a vacancy increase or improvements to unit or buildings after vacancy.
Created a stepped vacancy increase for a two-year lease of 5% if vacant less than two years, 10% if vacant less than three years, 15% if vacant less than four years, 20% if vacant four or more years.  The vacancy increase for a one-year lease is less by the approved percentage difference in lease increases between one- and two-year leases.
Changed the amortization period for major capital improvements from 84 months to 96 months in buildings with less than 35 units and changed the amortization period for major capital improvements from 84 months to 108 months in buildings with 35 or more units.

The New York State Legislature in Albany enacted the Housing Stability and Tenant Protection Act of 2019 in June of that year.

 Makes the rent regulation system permanent, so they will not sunset at any time in the future without an act of the Legislature to repeal or terminate them.
 Repeals the provisions that allow the removal of units from rent stabilization when the rent crosses a statutory high-rent threshold and the unit becomes vacant or the tenant's income is $200,000 or higher in the preceding two years.
 Limits the use of the "owner use" provision to a single unit, requires that the owner or their immediate family use the unit as their primary residence, and protects long-term tenants from eviction under this exception by reducing the current length of tenancy required to be protected from eviction to 15 years.
 Limits the temporary non-profit exception to rent stabilization by requiring units to remain rent-stabilized if they are provided to individuals who are or were homeless or are at risk of homelessness. Provides individuals permanently or temporarily housed by nonprofits status as tenants while ensuring that units used for these purposes remain rent stabilized.
 Repeals the "vacancy bonus" provision that allows a property owner to raise rents as much as 20 percent each time a unit becomes vacant. Repeals the "longevity bonus" provision that allows rents to be raised by additional amounts based on the duration of the previous tenancy. Prohibits local Rent Guidelines Boards from reinstating vacancy bonus on their own. 
 Prohibits Rent Guidelines Boards from setting additional increases based on the current rental cost of a unit or the amount of time since the owner was authorized to take additional rent increases, such as a vacancy bonus.
 Prohibits owners who have offered tenants a "preferential rent" below the legal regulated rent from raising the rent to the full legal rent upon renewal. Once the tenant vacates, the owner can charge any rent up to the full legal regulated rent, so long as the tenant did not vacate due to the owner's failure to maintain the unit in habitable condition. Owners with rent-setting regulatory agreements with federal or state agencies will still be permitted to use preferential rents based on their particular agreements.
 Sets Maximum Collectible Rent increases for rent controlled tenants at the average of the five most recent Rent Guidelines Board annual rent increases for one-year renewals. This bill also prohibits fuel pass-along charges.
 Extends the four-year look-back period to six or more years as reasonably necessary to determine a reliable base rent, extends the period for which an owner can be liable for rent overcharge claims from two to six years, and would no longer allow owners to avoid treble damages if they voluntarily return the amount of the rent overcharge prior to a decision being made by a court or Housing and Community Renewal (HCR). Allows tenants to assert their overcharge claims in court or at HCR and states that while an owner may discard records after six years, they do so at their own risk.
 Lowers the rent increase cap for Major Capital Improvements (MCIs) from six percent to two percent in New York City and from 15 percent to two percent in other counties. Provides the same protections of the two percent cap going forward on MCI rent increases attributable to MCIs that became effective within the prior seven years. Lowers increases further by lengthening the MCI formula's amortization period. Eliminates MCI increases after 30 years instead of allowing them to remain in effect permanently. Significantly tightens the rules governing what spending may qualify for MCI increases and tightens enforcement of those rules by requiring that 25 percent of MCIs be inspected and audited.
 Caps the amount of IAI spending at $15,000 over a 15-year period and allows owners to make up to three IAIs during that time. Makes IAI increases temporary for 30 years rather than permanent and requires owners to clear any hazardous violations in the apartment before collecting an increase. 
 Requires HCR to submit an annual report on the programs and activities undertaken by the Office of Rent Administration and the Tenant Protection Unit regarding implementation, administration and enforcement of the rent regulation system. The report will also include data points regarding the number of rent stabilized units within each county, application and approvals for major capital improvements, units with preferential rents, rents charged, and overcharge complaints.
 Strengthens and makes permanent the system that protects tenants in buildings that owners seek to convert into co-ops or condos. Eliminates the option of "eviction plans" and institutes reforms for non-eviction plans. Requires 51 percent of tenants in residence to agree to purchase apartments before the conversion can be effective. (Currently 15 percent of apartments must be sold and the purchasers may be outside investors.) For market-rate senior citizens and disabled tenants during conversion, evictions are permitted only for good cause, where an unconscionable rent increase does not constitute good cause.
 Removes the geographical restrictions on the applicability of the rent stabilization laws, allowing any municipality that otherwise meets the statutory requirements (e.g., less than five percent vacancy in the housing stock to be regulated) to opt into rent stabilization.

Warehousing 
Because rent regulation limits the amount of rent a landlord can legally collect from tenants, many landlords warehouse their rent regulated units and avoid advertising vacancies. With the passing of the New York's Housing Stability and Tenant Protection Act of 2019, landlords are no longer able to legally increase rent upon vacancy in rent stabilized units; previously, landlords were legally allowed to raise rents up to 20% between tenants to recoup construction cost. Many landlords do not fill their vacant rent stabilized units, as the operational and renovation costs may exceed the legal maximum rent. As of 2022, there are roughly 20,000 vacant rent stabilized apartments in New York City.

Frankensteining 
Frankensteining is a legal loophole which allows landlords to convert a rent regulated unit into a market rate unit. By combining a rent regulated unit with another unit (either combining a market rate unit with a rent regulated unit or merging two rent regulated units), the new unit becomes market rate.

Rental unit distribution in New York City

See also
 Law of New York

 Real Estate Board of New York 
 421-a tax exemption

Footnotes

Further reading
 Walter Block, "Rent Control" in The Concise Encyclopedia of Economics.
 Robert M. Fogelson, The Great Rent Wars: New York, 1917–1929. New Haven, CT: Yale University Press, 2013.

External links

 
 NYC Rent Guidelines Board (RGB)
 Evicting Tenants in New York
 Text of the Rent Stabilization Law of 1969
 Text of the Rent Regulation Reform Act of 1993
 List of rent stabilized buildings in New York City

New York (state) law
United States
Regulation in the United States
Housing in New York (state)